Agapanthia kirbyi is a species of beetle in the family Cerambycidae. It was described by Gyllenhal in 1817.

References

kirbyi
Beetles described in 1817